Rimel is an unincorporated community in Pocahontas County, West Virginia, United States.

Reuben D. Rimel, an early postmaster, gave the community his name.

References

Unincorporated communities in Pocahontas County, West Virginia
Unincorporated communities in West Virginia